Khwarazm (Old Persian: Hwârazmiya; , Xwârazm or Xârazm) or Chorasmia is a large oasis region on the Amu Darya river delta in western Central Asia, bordered on the north by the (former) Aral Sea, on the east by the Kyzylkum Desert, on the south by the Karakum Desert, and on the west by the Ustyurt Plateau. It was the center of the Iranian Khwarezmian civilization, and a series of kingdoms such as the Afrighid dynasty and the Anushtegin dynasty, whose capitals were (among others) Kath, Gurganj (now Konye-Urgench) and – from the 16th century on – Khiva. Today Khwarazm belongs partly to Uzbekistan and partly to Turkmenistan.

Names and etymology

Names 
Khwarazm has been known also as Chorasmia, Khaurism, Khwarezm, Khwarezmia, Khwarizm, Khwarazm, Khorezm, Khoresm, Khorasam, Kharazm, Harezm, Horezm, and Chorezm.

in Old Persian 𐎢𐎺𐎠𐎼𐏀𐎷𐎡𐏁  or 𐎢𐎺𐎠𐎼𐏀𐎷𐎡𐎹  (/hUvārazmī-/);
in Modern  ;
in Old Chinese *;
in Modern Chinese  ( / Xiao'erjing: خُوَلاذِمُوْ);

Etymology 

Another view is that the Iranian compound stands for 'lowland' from  'low' and  'land'. Khwarazm is indeed the lowest region in Central Asia (except for the Caspian Sea to the far west), located on the delta of the Amu Darya on the southern shores of the Aral Sea.

The name also appears in Achaemenid inscriptions as Huvarazmish, which is declared to be part of the Persian Empire.

These sources claim that Old Urgench, which was the capital of ancient Khwarazm for many years, was actually Ourva, the eighth land of Ahura Mazda mentioned in the Pahlavi text of Vendidad. However, Michael Witzel, a researcher in early Indo-European history, believes that Airyanem Vaejah was in what is now Afghanistan, the northern areas of which were a part of ancient Khwarazm and Greater Khorasan. Others, however, disagree. University of Hawaii historian Elton L. Daniel believes Khwarazm to be the "most likely locale" corresponding to the original home of the Avestan people, and Dehkhoda calls Khwarazm "the cradle of the Aryan tribe".

Legendary history 
Al-Biruni (973–1048), a native Khwarezmian,
says that the land belonging to the mythical king Afrasiab was first colonised 980 years before Alexander the Great (thus c. 1292 BC, well before the Seleucid era) when the hero of the Iranian epic Siyavash came to Khwarazm; his son Kay Khusraw came to the throne 92 years later, in 1200 BC Al-Biruni starts giving names only with the Afrighid line of Khwarazmshahs, having placed the ascension of Afrighids in 616 of the Seleucid era, i.e. in 305 AD

Early people 

Like Sogdia, Khwarazm was an expansion of the Bactria–Margiana culture during the Bronze Age, which later fused with Indo-Iranians during their migrations around 1000 BC. Early Iron Age states arose from this cultural exchange. List of successive cultures in Khwarazm region 3000–500 BC:
 Kelteminar culture c. 3000 BC
 Suyarganovo culture c 2000 BC
 Tazabagyab culture c. 1500 BC
 Amirabad Culture c 1000 BC
 Saka c. 500 BC

During the final Saka phase, there were about 400 settlements in Khwarezm. Ruled by the native Afrighid dynasty. It was at this point that Khwarezm entered the historical record with the Achaemenid expansion.

Khwarezmian language and culture 
An East Iranian language, Khwarezmian was spoken in Khwarezm proper (i.e., the lower Amu Darya region) until soon after the Mongol invasion, when it was replaced by Turkic languages. It was closely related to Sogdian. Other than the astronomical terms used by the native Iranian Khwarezmian speaker Al-Biruni, our other sources of Khwarezmian include al-Zamakhshari's Arabic-Persian–Khwarezmian dictionary and several legal texts that use Khwarezmian terms to explain certain legal concepts.

For most of its history, up until the Mongol conquest, the inhabitants of the area were from Iranian stock and they spoke an Eastern Iranian language called Khwarezmian. The famous scientist Al-Biruni, a Khwarezm native, in his Athar ul-Baqiyah, specifically verifies the Iranian origins of Khwarezmians when he wrote (in Arabic):

("The people of the Khwarezm were a branch from Persian tree.")

The area of Khwarezm was under Afrighid and then Samanid control until the 10th century before it was conquered by the Ghaznavids. The Iranian Khwarezmian language and culture felt the pressure of Turkic infiltration from northern Khwarezm southwards, leading to the disappearance of the original Iranian character of the province and its complete Turkicisation today, but Khwarezmian speech probably lasted in upper Khwarezm, the region round Hazarasp, till the end of the 8th/14th century.

The Khwarezmian language survived for several centuries after Islam until the Turkification of the region, and so must some at least of the culture and lore of ancient Khwarezm, for it is hard to see the commanding figure of Al-Biruni, a repository of so much knowledge, appearing in a cultural vacuum.

Achaemenid period 

The Achaemenid Empire took control of Chorasmia possibly during the reign of Cyrus the Great in the 6th century BC, and certainly by the time of King Darius I (ruled 550–486 BC). The son of Cyrus Smerdis/Bardiya became the governor of the region, along with Bactriana, Carmania, and the other eastern provinces of the empire. And the Persian poet Ferdowsi mentions Persian cities like Afrasiab and Chach in abundance in his epic Shahnama. The contact with the Achaemenid Empire had a great influence on the material culture of Chorasmia, starting a period of rich economic and cultural development.

Chorasmian troops participated in the Second Persian invasion of Greece by Xerxes in the 480 BC, under the command of Achaemenid general and later satrap Artabazos I of Phrygia. By the time of the Persian king Darius III, Khwarazm had already become an independent kingdom.

Hellenistic period 

Chorasmia was involved in the conquests of Alexander the Great in Central Asia. When the king of Khwarezm offered friendship to Alexander in 328 BC, Alexander's Greek and Roman biographers imagined the nomad king of a desert waste, but 20th-century Russian archeologists revealed the region as a stable and centralized kingdom, a land of agriculture to the east of the Aral Sea, surrounded by the nomads of Central Asia, protected by its army of mailed horsemen, in the most powerful kingdom northwest of the Amu Darya (the Oxus River of antiquity). The king's emissary offered to lead Alexander's armies against his own enemies, west over the Caspian towards the Black Sea (e.g. Kingdom of Iberia and Colchis). Alexander politely refused.

Khwarezm was largely independent during the Seleucid, Greco-Bactrian and Arsacid dynasties. Numerous fortresses were built, and the Khwarazm oasis has been dubbed the "Fifty fortresses oasis". Chorasmia remained relatively sheltered from the interests of the Seleucid Empire or Greco-Bactria, but various elements of Hellenistic art appear in the ruins of Chorasmian cities, particularly at Akchakhan-Kala, and the influence of the Greco-Buddhist art of Gandhara, reflecting the rise of Kushan Empire, appears at Toprak-Kala. The early rulers of Chorasmia first imitated the coinage of the Greco-Bactrian ruler Eucratides I. Parthian artistic influences have also been described.

From the 1st century BC, Chorasmia developed original coins inspired from Greco-Bactrian, Parthian, and Indo-Scythian types. Artav (Artabanus), a Chorasmian ruler of the 1st–2nd century AD, whose coins were discovered in the capital city of Toprak-Kala, imitated the type of the Kushan Heraios and were found together with coins of the Kushan rulers Vima Kadphises and Kanishka.

From the 2nd century AD, Chorasmia became part of the vast cultural sphere corresponding to the rise of the Kushan Empire in the east.

Sassanid period 

Under Shapur I, the Sasanian Empire spread as far as Khwarezm. Yaqut al-Hamawi verifies that Khwarezm was a regional capital of the Sassanid empire. When speaking of the pre-Islamic "khosrau of Khwarezm", the Islamic "amir of Khwarezm", or even the Khwarezmid Empire, sources such as Al-Biruni and Ibn Khordadbeh and others clearly refer to Khwarezm as being part of the Iranian (Persian) empire. During the reign of Khosrow II, extensive areas of Khwarezm were conquered.

The fact that Pahlavi script which was used by the Persian bureaucracy alongside Old Persian, passed into use in Khwarezmia where it served as the first local alphabet about the AD 2nd century, as well as evidence that Khwarezm-Shahs such as ʿAlā al-Dīn Tekish (1172–1200) issued all their orders (both administrative and public) in Persian language, corroborates Al-Biruni's claims. It was also a vassal kingdom during periods of Kushans, Hephthalites and Gokturks power before the coming of the Arabs.

Afrighids 

Per Al-Biruni, the Afrighids of Kath were a native Khwarezmian Iranian dynasty which ruled as the Shahs of Khwarezm from 305 to 995 AD. At times they were under Sassanian suzerainty.

In 712, Khwarezm was conquered by the Arab Caliphate (Umayyads and Abbasids). It thus came vaguely under Muslim control, but it was not till the end of the 8th century and the beginning of the 9th century that an Afrighid Shah first converted to Islam appearing with the popular convert's name of ʿAbdullah ('slave of God'). In the course of the 10th century—when some geographers such as Istakhri in his Al-Masalik wa-l-mamalik mention Khwarezm as part of Khorasan and Transoxiania—the local Ma'munids, based in Gurganj on the left bank of the Amu Darya, grew in economic and political importance due to trade caravans. In 995, they violently overthrew the Afrighids and themselves assumed the traditional title of Khwarazm-Shah.

Briefly, the area was under Samanid suzerainty, before it passed to Mahmud of Ghazni in 1017. From then on, Turko-Mongolian invasions and long rule by Turko-Mongol dynasties supplanted the Iranian character of the region although the title of Khwarezm-Shah was maintained well up to the 13th century.

Khwarezmid Empire 

The date of the founding of the Khwarazmian dynasty remains debatable. During a revolt in 1017, Khwarezmian rebels murdered Abu'l-Abbas Ma'mun and his wife, Hurra-ji, sister of the Ghaznavid sultan Mahmud. In response, Mahmud invaded and occupied the region of Khwarezm, which included Nasa and the ribat of Farawa. As a result, Khwarezm became a province of the Ghaznavid Empire from 1017 to 1034. In 1077, the governorship of the province, which since 1042/1043 belonged to the Seljuqs, fell into the hands of Anush Tigin Gharchai, a former Turkic slave of the Seljuq sultan. In 1141, the Seljuq Sultan Ahmed Sanjar was defeated by the Qara Khitai at the battle of Qatwan, and Anush Tigin's grandson Ala ad-Din Atsiz became a vassal to Yelü Dashi of the Qara Khitan.

Sultan Ahmed Sanjar died in 1156. As the Seljuk state fell into chaos, the Khwarezm-Shahs expanded their territories southward. In 1194, the last Sultan of the Great Seljuq Empire, Toghrul III, was defeated and killed by the Khwarezm ruler Ala ad-Din Tekish, who conquered parts of Khorasan and western Iran. In 1200, Tekish died and was succeeded by his son, Ala ad-Din Muhammad, who initiated a conflict with the Ghurids and was defeated by them at Amu Darya (1204). Following the sack of Khwarizm, Muhammad appealed for aid from his suzerain, the Qara Khitai who sent him an army. With this reinforcement, Muhammad won a victory over the Ghorids at Hezarasp (1204) and forced them out of Khwarizm.

Mongol conquest by Genghis Khan

The Khwarezmid Empire ruled over all of Persia in the early 13th century under Shah ʿAlāʾ al-Dīn Muhammad II (1200–1220). From 1218 to 1220, Genghis Khan conquered Central Asia including the Kara-Khitai Khanate, thus ending the Khwarezmid Empire. Sultan Muhammad died after retreating from the Mongols near the Caspian Sea, while his son Jalal ad-Din, after being defeated by Genghis Khan at the Battle of Indus, sought refuge with the Delhi Sultanate, and was later assassinated after various attempts to defeat the Mongols and the Seljuks.

Khwarezm during the rule of Qunghrat dynasty (1360–1388) 
In 1360 there arose in Ḵwarazm an independent minor dynasty of Qunghrat Turks, the Ṣūfīs, but Solaymān Ṣūfī was crushed by Timur in 1388.

The Islamization of Khwarazm was reflected in the creation of literary, scientific and religious works and in the translation of Arabic works into the Turkic language. In the Suleymaniye Library in Istanbul, the Koran is kept with an interlinear translation into Turkic, written in Khwarazm and dated (January – February 1363).

The region of Khwarezm was split between the White Horde and Jagatai Khanate, and its rebuilt capital Gurganj (modern Kunya Urgench, "Old Gorganj" as opposed to the modern city of Urgench some distance away) again became one of the largest and most important trading centers in Central Asia. In the mid-14th century Khwarezm gained independence from the Golden Horde under the Sufid dynasty. However, Timur regarded Khwarezm as a rival to Samarkand, and over the course of five campaigns, destroyed Urganch in 1388.

Khwarazm during the reign Shibanids – Arabshahids 

Control of the region was disputed by the Timurids and the Golden Horde, but in 1511 it passed to a new, local Uzbek dynasty, the ʿArabshahids.

This, together with a shift in the course of the Amu-Darya, caused the center of Khwarezm to shift to Khiva, which became in the 16th century the capital of the Khanate of Khiva, ruled over by the dynasty of the Arabshahids.

Khiva Khanate is the name of Khwarazm adopted in the Russian historical tradition during the period of its existence (1512–1920). The Khiva Khanate was one of the Uzbek khanates. The term "Khiva Khanate" was used for the state in Khwarazm that existed from the beginning of the 16th century until 1920. The term "Khiva Khanate" was not used by the locals, who used the name Khvarazm. In Russian sources the term Khiva Khanate began to be used from the 18th century.

The rumors of gold on the banks of the Amu Darya during the reign of Russia's Peter the Great, together with the desire of the Russian Empire to open a trade route to the Indus (modern day Pakistan), prompted an armed trade expedition to the region, led by Prince Alexander Bekovich-Cherkassky, which was repelled by Khiva.

Khwarazm during the reign Uzbek dynasty of Qungrats 
During the reign of the Uzbek Khan Said Muhammad Khan (1856–1864) in the 1850s, for the first time in the history of Khwarazm, a general population census of Khwarazm was carried out.

Khwarazm in 1873–1920 
It was under Tsars Alexander II and Alexander III that serious efforts to annex the region started. One of the main pretexts for Russian military expeditions to Khiva was to free Russian slaves in the khanate and to prevent future slave capture and trade.

Early in The Great Game, Russian interests in the region collided with those of the British Empire in the First Anglo-Afghan War in 1839.

The Khanate of Khiva was gradually reduced in size from Russian expansion in Turkestan (including Khwarezm) and, in 1873, a peace treaty was signed that established Khiva as a quasi-independent Russian protectorate.

In 1912, the Khiva Khanate numbered up to 440 schools and up to 65 madrasahs with 22,500 students. More than half of the madrasahs were in the city of Khiva (38).

Soviet period 
After the Bolshevik seizure of power in the October Revolution, a short-lived Khorezm People's Soviet Republic (later the Khorezm SSR) was created out of the territory of the old Khanate of Khiva, before in 1924 it was finally incorporated into the Soviet Union, with the former Khanate divided between the new Turkmen SSR, Uzbek SSR and Karakalpakstan ASSR (initially part of Kazakh ASSR as Karakalpak Oblast).

The larger historical area of Khwarezm is further divided. Northern Khwarezm became the Uzbek SSR, and in 1925 the western part became the Turkmen SSR. Also, in 1936 the northwestern part became the Kazakh SSR. Following the collapse of the Soviet Union in 1991, these became Uzbekistan, Turkmenistan and Kazakhstan respectively. Many of the ancient Khwarezmian towns now lie in Xorazm Region, Uzbekistan.

Today, the area that was Khwarezm has a mixed population of Uzbeks, Karakalpaks, Turkmens, Tajiks, Tatars, and Kazakhs.

In Persian literature 

Khwarezm and her cities appear in Persian literature in abundance, in both prose and poetry. Dehkhoda for example defines the name Bukhara itself as "full of knowledge", referring to the fact that in antiquity, Bukhara was a scientific and scholarship powerhouse. Rumi verifies this when he praises the city as such.

Other examples illustrate the eminent status of Khwarezmid and Transoxianian cities in Persian literature in the past 1500 years:

The world of hearts is under his power in the same manner that

The Khwarazmshahs have brought peace to the world.
—Khaqani Shirvani

A greedy one went to Khwarezm-shah

early one morning, so I have heard
—Saadi

Yaqut al-Hamawi, who visited Khwarezm and its capital in 1219, wrote: "I have never seen a city more wealthy and beautiful than Gurganj". The city, however, was destroyed during several invasions, in particular when the Mongol army broke the dams of the Amu Darya, which flooded the city. He reports that for every Mongol soldier, four inhabitants of Gurganj were killed. Najmeddin Kubra, the great Sufi master, was among the casualties. The Mongol army that devastated Gurganj was estimated to have been near 80,000 soldiers. The verse below refers to an early previous calamity that fell upon the region:

Oh land of Khorasan! God has saved you,

from the disaster that befell the land of Gurganj and Kath
—Divan of Anvari

Notable people 

The following either hail from Khwarezm, or lived and are buried there:

 Al-Biruni, outstanding scholar
 Ma'mun II, Khwarezm Shah and founder of an academy
 Najm al-Din Kubra, Sufi mystic
 Rashid al-Din Vatvat, panegyrist and epistolographer
 Fakhr al-Din Razi
 Ala al-Din Atsiz, Khwarezm Shah
 Ala al-Din Muhammad, Khwarezm Shah
 Jalal ad-Din Menguberdi, Khwarezm Shah
 Abu l-Hasan Sa'eedeh ibn Sa'deh, commentary writer on the writings of Sibawayh.
 Abaaq al-Khwarazmi
 Muhammad ibn Musa al-Khwarizmi, mathematician (for whom the term algorithm is named.)
 Muhammad ibn Ahmad al-Khwarizmi, 10th century encyclopedist who wrote Mafatih al-'Ulum ("Key to the Sciences").
 Zamakhshari, scholar
 Qutb al-zaman Muhammad ibn Abu-Tahir Marvazi, philosopher
 Al-Marwazi, astronomer
 Mahmud Yalavach, ambassador and governor of Mavaraunnahr (1224–1238)
 Abu l-Ghazi Bahadur, Khan and historian

See also 

 Eurasian Avars, alliance of Eurasian nomads (6th–9th century AD)
 Karakalpakstan, autonomous republic within Uzbekistan
 Keraites, 12th-century Turco-Mongol tribal confederation
 Khorezm People's Soviet Republic (1920–1923/25)
 Khwarezmian language, extinct East Iranian language
 Koi Krylgan Kala, archaeological site; Khwarezmian settlement (c. 400 BCE – c. 400 AD)
 Mount Imeon, Hellenistic name for Hindu Kush, Pamir and Tian Shan mountains
 Uar, tribal confederation linked to the Huns (5th–8th century AD)
 Zoroaster (c. 1500–1000 BC), ancient Iranian prophet
 Zoroastrianism, ancient Iranian religion, still practiced

Crusader-related 
 Battle of La Forbie (1244), with decisive Khwarezmian participation; ends Crusader power in Levant
 Siege of Jerusalem (1244) by Khwarezmian tribes

References

Sources 
 Yuri Bregel. "The Sarts in the Khanate of Khiva", Journal of Asian History, Vol. 12, 1978, pp. 121–151
 Robin Lane Fox. Alexander the Great, pp. 308ff etc.
 Shir Muhammad Mirab Munis & Muhammad Reza Mirab Agahi. Firdaws al-Iqbal. History of Khorezm (Leiden: Brill) 1999, trans & ed. Yuri Bregel

External links 
 Jona Lendering, Chorasmia, on the ancient history of Khwarezmia
 E. Nerazik on Central Asia in the Early Middle Ages

 
Divided regions
Former countries in Central Asia
Historical regions of Iran
Geographic history of Uzbekistan
Empires and kingdoms of Iran
Historical regions
Aral Sea